The 80th Street station (signed as 80th Street–Hudson Street station) is a station on the IND Fulton Street Line of the New York City Subway. Located on Liberty Avenue at 80th Street in Ozone Park, Queens, it is served by the A train at all times.

History 
80th Street, which opened on September 25, 1915, was one of the eight stations along Liberty Avenue in Brooklyn and Queens built for the BMT Fulton Street Line. The first two, Crescent Street and Grant Avenue in Brooklyn, were the last two stations on the line from 1894 to 1915. In 1915, the BMT, under their portion of the Dual Contracts, added the current three-track elevated structure along the Queens section of Liberty Avenue, which is now the only remnant of the line. It ran the previous terminus at Grant Avenue to the present Ozone Park–Lefferts Boulevard station, adding six new stations overall.

The connection from this station west (railroad north) to the BMT el was severed on April 26, 1956. To replace that service, the underground IND line was extended east (railroad south) from its previous terminus at Euclid Avenue via a new connecting tunnel and ramp. An intermediate station, also called Grant Avenue, was built along this tunnel, right before the point where the track was then elevated to connect to the remaining sections of the BMT el. This service began on April 29, 1956.

Station layout

This elevated station has two side platforms and three tracks, but the center track is not used in revenue service. It is the westernmost (railroad north) station in Queens on the IND Fulton Street Line.

Both platforms have beige windscreens along their entire lengths and brown canopies with green frames and support columns except for a small section at either ends. Platform signs display 80 Street–Hudson Street, which was the original name of this station.

Exits
This station has two entrances/exits, both of which are elevated station houses beneath the tracks. The full-time one is at the south (geographical east) end of the station. Inside fare control, there is one staircase to each platform, a waiting area that allows a free transfer between directions, and a turnstile bank. Outside fare control, there is a token booth and two street stairs going down to either western corners of the T-intersection of 80th Street and Liberty Avenue.

The station's other entrance/exit at the north (geographical west) end also has one staircase to each platform, a waiting area, and two street stairs going down to either western corners of 77th Street and Liberty Avenue. The station house, however, is unstaffed, containing just two High Entry/Exit Turnstiles. Each staircase landing has an exit-only turnstile to allow passengers to exit the station without having to go through the station house.

Track layout

The station has three tracks: two outer, stopping tracks and one center track that bypasses the station. Part of the trackways to the BMT el still remain as this line curves south into the tunnel to Grant Avenue west of 80th Street. This segment can be found just east of the intersection of Liberty Avenue and 76th Street, as the newer structure curves south; an older part of the structure, which does not curve, continues for a few feet, with no tracks, on the north side of Liberty Avenue. The line enters the tunnel portal at the Brooklyn–Queens border.

As the tracks curve toward the tunnel, the center track dips to a lower level from the outer tracks and becomes a yard lead into Pitkin Yard.

East of the station are a pair of diamond crossovers. They allow trains to bypass 88th Street, the next station, and Rockaway Boulevard, the following station. However, only trains heading to the Rockaways can use this track because there are no switches east of Rockaway Boulevard to allow those trains back onto the outer tracks.

References

External links 

 
 Station Reporter — A Lefferts
 Station Reporter — A Rockaway
 The Subway Nut — 80th Street – Hudson Street Pictures 
 80th Street entrance from Google Maps Street View
 77th Street entrance from Google Maps Street View
 Platforms from Google Maps Street View

IND Fulton Street Line stations
BMT Fulton Street Line stations
New York City Subway stations in Queens, New York
Railway stations in the United States opened in 1915
1917 establishments in New York City
1915 establishments in New York City
Ozone Park, Queens